Dan "The Duke" Davis (born September 20, 1942) is an American radio personality. Davis was an original broadcaster of ESPN Radio based in Bristol, Connecticut. He anchored the midday portion of ESPN Radio SportsCenter. His voice was often heard introducing various ESPN programs. He is also known as "The Duke", originated by Curt Chaplin, who is best known as the announcer for The People's Court.

Before ESPN
Davis worked as a radio commentator for almost 30 years. He started his career in 1963 at WEMJ in Laconia, New Hampshire. Apart from working for WEMJ, Davis also worked in Boston for ten seasons as the radio voice of Boston College football on a New England-wide network. Davis called the Boston College vs. Miami game in 1984, and his commentary of the famous Doug Flutie to Gerard Phelan touchdown pass remains among the favorites of Boston area sports fans.

ESPN Radio
Davis joined ESPN Radio in January 1992. Davis was on The Tony Kornheiser Show between January 5, 1998, and March 26, 2004. When Davis reported the sports updates, the host, Tony Kornheiser, often interrupted Davis' reports with his own comments. Initially, Davis was shocked and not amused. However, later on Davis developed a very good chemistry with Kornheiser, and he even started to add humorous comments within his report to amuse (or annoy) Kornheiser. Davis and Kornheiser talking back and forth in this way prompted Kornheiser to say that The Duke was the glue of the show.

Throughout his tenure, Davis provided Sportcenter updates on ESPN Radio. Davis has also appeared on other programs. Sometimes, he made comments on Extra Point. He supplied his voice during the Week 10 edition of Mike and Mike's "Stone Cold Lead Pipe Locks" on November 7, 2008. On December 21, 2011, on Mike and Mike, it was announced that Davis was retiring from ESPN Radio, effective December 23.

Personal life
Davis' hometown is Portland, Maine. He currently lives in Bristol, Connecticut, with his wife Annette. They have four children, Dan, Greg, Steve and Cameron, and two grandchildren, Mike and Olivia.

See also 
 List of ESPN Radio personalities

References

External links 
 Hartford Courant Story on Dan Davis on June 6, 2003.
 USA Today article on Dan Davis on December 11, 2003.

1942 births
Living people
American sports radio personalities
Radio personalities from Maine
ESPN Radio
College football announcers
Boston College Eagles football announcers
People from Portland, Maine